Isabel Mirrow Brown (June 9, 1928 – August 2014) was an American ballerina. A fictionalized version of her life was documented in the 1977 film The Turning Point, in which she was portrayed by Shirley MacLaine, who was nominated for an Academy Award for her performance.

Personal life
She was born in New York City, United States, the daughter of Jewish-Russian immigrant parents Sonia and Alexander "Sasha" Mirrow (1893–1977).

She married dancer Kelly Kingman Brown (1928–1981) and had four children, dancers Leslie Browne and Elizabeth, and sons Kelly Brown II, a film producer, and Ethan Brown, who was a soloist dancer with ABT until 2004. Kelly Brown was from Mississippi and started dancing at a young age, his mother Sue was a dance instructor. He later moved to Chicago to train at the Stone-Camryn School of Ballet. He then moved to New York City to dance with ABT, where he met Isabel. At ABT he worked with Agnes de Mille.

Her husband, Kelly Brown, also was a featured dancer in several Hollywood musical films, including Seven Brides for Seven Brothers, Daddy Long Legs, The Girl Most Likely, and Oklahoma!. On Broadway he was the dance captain for I Can Get It for You Wholesale which starred Barbra Streisand. Nora Kaye, Arthur Laurents, and Herbert Ross also worked on that show and would later collaborate on The Turning Point.

In the 1960s after Kelly and Isabel had aged out of being principal dancers, they moved to Phoenix, Arizona to operate a dance studio. When their daughters auditioned for School of American Ballet in New York, Leslie was chosen, and her sister Elizabeth a year later. The move to Arizona caused a strain in the marriage when Isabel became homesick for her native New York. They divorced a year later and Isabel moved back to New York to watch over her daughters who had begun training there.

Career
Mirrow was a principal dancer with the American Ballet Theatre in New York City from 1947 until 1953. Some of her peers she danced with during this time include Svetlana Beriosova, Tamara Toumanova, and Irina Baronova.

In 1945, she danced in the Broadway musical The Day Before Spring. She later became a dance mentor for many aspiring dancers and worked with Finis Jhung's Ballet Company.

The Turning Point
Mirrow was childhood friends with the ballerina Nora Kaye. Their parents had immigrated from Russia to New York City at the same time and lived in the same brownstone apartment building. Kaye was later married to film director Herbert Ross. Nora Kaye was the godmother of the Brown's eldest daughter Leslie, born in 1957.

In the 1970s, a script by Arthur Laurents was developed based on the Brown Family. Shirley Maclaine was cast to play Isabel and originally, the dancer Gelsey Kirkland was cast to play Leslie. Kirkland dropped out of the film due to substance abuse problems, and Ross cast Leslie believing she would be able to portray a fictionalized version of herself in the film.

The film was directed by Herbert Ross and produced by Ross and Kaye. Released in 1977, The Turning Point was nominated for eleven Academy Awards, including Best Picture. Her daughter Leslie Browne (at age 20) was nominated for the Academy Award for Best Supporting Actress and Shirley MacLaine was nominated for playing Leslie's mother. The family name was changed to "Rodgers" for the film. Her daughter Leslie Browne had added an "e" to her name for her stage name, believing it sounded more feminine after being mistaken as male in a playbill. Her other daughter, Elizabeth (Brown) Healy (born 1959), was portrayed in the film by Lisa Lucas with her name changed to "Janina."

References

External links
 

1928 births
2014 deaths
American ballerinas
Prima ballerinas
Dancers from New York (state)
21st-century American women
20th-century American ballet dancers